The Bundesstraße 169 (abbreviation: B169) is a German federal highway in Brandenburg and in Saxony.

Route 
 Saxony:
 Neuensalz (0.,0 km) » B 173
 Falkenstein (15.0 km)
 Auerbach (21.2 km)
 Rodewisch (23.9 km) » B 94
 Stützengrün (32.8, km)
 Schneeberg (46.2 km) » B 93
 Aue (53.0 km) » B 101
 Lößnitz (59.4 km)
 Stollberg (69.4 km) » B 180
 Chemnitz (Südring) (83.0 km) » B 173
 Chemnitz (88.0 km) » B 95
 Frankenberg (100.9 km) » B 180
 Hainichen (110.2 km)
 Döbeln (128.0 km) » B 175
 Autobahnauffahrt Döbeln-Nord (132.0 km) » A 14
 Ostrau (Sachsen) (137.8 km)
 Riesa-Seerhausen (150.6 km) » B 6
 Riesa (157.7 km) » B 182
 Elbebrücke
 Zeithain (162.6 km) » B 98
 Gröditz (157.9 km)
 Brandenburg:
 Prösen (180.0 km) » B 101
 Elsterwerda (186.4 km) » B 101
 Lauchhammer (201.5 km)
 Schwarzheide (209.0 km)
 Autobahnauffahrt Ruhland (211.0 km) » A 13
 Schwarzheide (211.5 km)
 Senftenberg (223.5 km) » B 96
 Allmosen (231.2 km) » B 96 »B 156
 Drebkau (244.5 km)
 Cottbus (257.3 km) » B 97

History

Origin 
The stretch of road between  Chemnitz and Stollberg was upgraded to a Chaussee in 1823.

Earlier descriptions 
The Reichsstraße 169 between Cottbus and Neuensalz was inaugurated in 1937. During the East German years the road was known as the Fernverkehrsstraße 169 (long distance route 169) (abbreviation F169) .

See also 
 List of roads in Saxony
 List of federal roads in Germany

External links 

169
B169
B169